Golemi Stol is a mountain in southern Serbia, near the town of Babušnica. Its highest peak has an elevation of 1238 meters above sea level.

References

Mountains of Serbia